The Mininera & District Football League is based in South-western Victoria, with clubs located east of Hamilton, south of Ararat and west of Colac. The league absorbed several teams from the defunct Ararat & District Football Association in 2000.

History
The Mininera & District Football Association formed in 1925. In the early 1950s, eight clubs participated: Carranballac, Glenthompson, Lake Bolac, Mininera-Westmere Rovers, Streatham, Tatyoon, Wickliffe and Willaura.

In 1954, Mininera-Westmere Rovers merged with Streatham to form the SMW Rovers, and Dunkeld and Woorndoo entered the competition. In 1956, Woorndoo left the competition for the nearby Mount Noorat Football League.

In 1963, Carranballac folded. Caramut joined the competition from 1965 from the Port Fairy Football League. In 1970, Hawkesdale and Penshurst entered, and the competition changed its name to the Mininera & District Football League.

In 1986, Wickliffe merged with Lake Bolac, and Woorndoo re-entered the league in 1987.

In 1998, Hawkesdale merged with Macarthur (from the South West District Football League) and Willaura went into recess. In 1999 Lismore-Derrinallum entered the competition.

In 2000, the Mininera and District Football League absorbed some of the clubs from the defunct Ararat & District Football Association, including Caledonians-Miners, Prestige-Trinity and Moyston. Caledonians-Miners and Prestige-Trinity merged to form Ararat United, whilst Moyston merged with Willaura. In 2001, Woorndoo merged with Mortlake and Dunkeld went into recess. In 2003 Dunkeld merged with Glenthompson, and Ararat United went into recess before officially folding in 2005.

The Ararat Eagles, who joined the competition in 2011 from the Lexton Plains Football League, which disbanded after the 2010 season.
Great Western, originally from the Ararat & District Football Association, joined the league from the Horsham & District Football League in 2012, following a year in recess.

Clubs

Current

Former clubs

Premierships

	1925	Lake Bolac
	1926	Streatham
	1927	Streatham
	1928	Carranballac
	1929	Lake Bolac
	1930	WM Rovers
	1931	Streatham
	1932	Carranballac
	1933	WM Rovers
	1934	WM Rovers
	1935	Carranballac
	1936	Streatham
	1937	Streatham
	1938	WM Rovers
	1939	Streatham
	1940	- 1945 Recess
	1946	Tatyoon
	1947	WM Rovers
	1948	Lake Bolac
	1949	Lake Bolac
	1950	Lake Bolac
	1951	Willaura
	1952	Tatyoon
	1953	Willaura

	1954	Lake Bolac
	1955	Lake Bolac
	1956	Lake Bolac
	1957	Lake Bolac
	1958	Willaura
	1959	Wickliffe
	1960	SWM Rovers
	1961	Willaura
	1962	Willaura
	1963	SWM Rovers
	1964	SWM Rovers
	1965	Lake Bolac
	1966	Willaura
	1967	SWM Rovers
	1968	SWM Rovers
	1969	Glenthompson
	1970	Penshurst
	1971	Caramut
	1972	Tatyoon
	1973	Penshurst
	1974	Glenthompson
	1975	Willaura
	1976	Dunkeld
	1977	Hawkesdale

	1978	Glenthompson
	1979	Penshurst
	1980	Tatyoon
	1981	Penshurst
	1982	Glenthompson
	1983	Glenthompson
	1984	Wickliffe
	1985	Glenthompson
	1986	Penshurst
	1987	SWM Rovers
	1988	Hawkesdale
	1989	Wickliffe-Lake Bolac
	1990	Wickliffe-Lake Bolac
	1991	Penshurst
	1992	Penshurst
	1993	Penshurst
	1994	Caramut
	1995	Tatyoon
	1996	Tatyoon
	1997	Wickliffe-Lake Bolac
	1998	Tatyoon
	1999	Caramut
	2000	Wickliffe-Lake Bolac
	2001	Wickliffe-Lake Bolac

	2002	Wickliffe-Lake Bolac
	2003	SWM Rovers
	2004	SWM Rovers
	2005	Wickliffe-Lake Bolac
	2006	Tatyoon
	2007	Tatyoon
	2008	Tatyoon
	2009	Penshurst
	2010	Glenthompson-Dunkeld
	2011	Tatyoon
	2012	Penshurst
	2013	Wickliffe-Lake Bolac
	2014	Moyston-Willaura
	2015	Lismore-Derrinallum
	2016	Tatyoon
	2017	Lismore-Derrinallum
	2018	Wickliffe-Lake Bolac
	2019	Great Western
   2020    League in recess due to COVID19 pandemic 
   2021    Finals cancelled due to COVID19 pandemic
   2022    Ararat Eagles

Leading Goal Kickers

2001 Ladder

2002 Ladder

2003 Ladder

2004 Ladder

2005 Ladder

2006 Ladder

2007 Ladder

2008 Ladder

2009 Ladder

2010 Ladder

2011 Ladder

2012 Ladder

2013 Ladder

2014 Ladder

2015 Ladder

2016 Ladder

2017 Ladder

References

External links
Official Mininera & District Football League Website
 Full Points Footy -Mininera & District Football League

Australian rules football competitions in Victoria (Australia)